The 1955 Masters Tournament was the 19th Masters Tournament, held April 7–10 at Augusta National Golf Club in Augusta, Georgia.  It was the last one before CBS began televising the tournament the following year.

Cary Middlecoff shot a 65 in the second round, including a then-record 31 on the first nine, to win his only Masters, seven strokes ahead of runner-up Ben Hogan, and the second of his three major championships.

After a third round at even-par 72, Middlecoff entered the final round with a four shot lead over  Hogan, the champion in 1951 and 1953. The victory margin of seven strokes was a tournament record for ten years, until Jack Nicklaus won by nine strokes over Arnold Palmer and Gary Player in 1965, later increased to twelve in 1997 by Tiger Woods. The previous record was five strokes, set in 1948 by Claude Harmon and tied by Hogan in 1953. The runner-up finish was Hogan's fourth at the Masters.

Arnold Palmer, a professional for less than a year, finished tied for tenth in his first Masters.

The Sarazen Bridge, approaching the left side of the 15th green, was dedicated on Wednesday to commemorate the 20th anniversary of Gene Sarazen's double eagle in 1935.

Course

^ Holes 1, 2, 4, 11, and 14 were later renamed.

Field
1. Masters champions
Claude Harmon (10), Ben Hogan (2,4,6,9,10), Herman Keiser, Byron Nelson (2,6,9), Henry Picard (6), Gene Sarazen (2,4,6), Horton Smith, Sam Snead (4,6,9,10,12), Craig Wood (2)
Jimmy Demaret and Ralph Guldahl (2) did not play.

2. U.S. Open champions
Julius Boros (9,10), Billy Burke, Johnny Farrell, Ed Furgol (10), Lawson Little (3,5), Tony Manero, Lloyd Mangrum (9,10), Fred McLeod, Cary Middlecoff (9,10,12), Sam Parks Jr., Lew Worsham (9,10)

3. U.S. Amateur champions
Ted Bishop (a), Dick Chapman (5,9,10,a), Charles Coe (9,a), Gene Littler (9,10), Billy Maxwell, Arnold Palmer (11), Skee Riegel (9), Jess Sweetser (5,a), Bud Ward

4. British Open champions
Jock Hutchison (6), Denny Shute (6)

5. British Amateur champions
Frank Stranahan, Robert Sweeny Jr. (11,a), Harvie Ward (8,9,a)

6. PGA champions
Walter Burkemo (9,12), Vic Ghezzi, Chick Harbert (9,12), Chandler Harper, Johnny Revolta, Jim Turnesa

7. Members of the U.S. 1955 Ryder Cup team
Team not selected in time for inclusion

8. Members of the U.S. 1955 Walker Cup team
Rex Baxter (a), William C. Campbell (10,a), Don Cherry (11,a), Joe Conrad (a), Bruce Cudd (a), Jimmy Jackson (a), Ed Meister (11,a), Dale Morey (11,a), Billy Joe Patton (9,10,a), Hillman Robbins (a)

Dick Yost (a) did not play. Baxter, Meister and Robbins were reserves for the team.

9. Top 24 players and ties from the 1954 Masters Tournament
Jerry Barber (12), Al Besselink, Tommy Bolt (10,12), Jack Burke Jr. (10), Pete Cooper, Marty Furgol (10), Jay Hebert (10), Ed Oliver, Bob Rosburg, Earl Stewart, Bob Toski (10)

Dutch Harrison and Ken Venturi (a) did not play.

10. Top 24 players and ties from the 1954 U.S. Open
Max Evans, Leland Gibson, Fred Haas, Dick Mayer, Shelley Mayfield (12), Al Mengert, Johnny Weitzel

11. 1954 U.S. Amateur quarter-finalists
Ted Lenczyk (a), Davis Love Jr. (a)

Ed Martin (a) did not play.

12. 1954 PGA Championship quarter-finalists

13. One amateur, not already qualified, selected by a ballot of ex-U.S. Amateur champions
Bill Goodloe (a)

14. One professional, not already qualified, selected by a ballot of ex-U.S. Open champions
Johnny Palmer

15. Two players, not already qualified, from a points list based on finishes in the winter part of the 1955 PGA Tour
Mike Souchak, Bo Wininger

16. Foreign invitations
Pat Fletcher, Rudy Horvath (10), Stan Leonard, Peter Thomson (4,9)

Numbers in brackets indicate categories that the player would have qualified under had they been American.

Round summaries

First round
Thursday, April 7, 1955

Source:

Second round
Friday, April 8, 1955

Source:

Third round
Saturday, April 9, 1955

Source:

Final round
Sunday, April 10, 1955

Final leaderboard

Sources:

Scorecard

Cumulative tournament scores, relative to par
{|class="wikitable" span = 50 style="font-size:85%;
|-
|  style="background:Red; width:10px;"|
|Eagle
|  style="background:Pink; width:10px;"|
|Birdie
|  style="background:PaleGreen; width:10px;"|
|Bogey
|  style="background:Green; width:10px;"|
|Double bogey
|  style="background:Olive; width:10px;"|
|Triple bogey +
|}

References

External links
Masters.com – past winners and results
Augusta.com – 1955 Masters leaderboard and scorecards

1955
1955 in golf
1955 in American sports
1955 in sports in Georgia (U.S. state)
April 1955 sports events in the United States